Ferenc Harrer (2 June 1874 – 21 November 1969) was a Hungarian politician, who served as Minister of Foreign Affairs in 1919. His father was Pál Harrer, the only mayor of Óbuda. Ferenc Harrer pursued his father's politics in connection with Budapest; he was the first one elaborating for Greater Budapest's plan. He supervised the flat broke town of Gyöngyös' reconstruction from 1917. In the next year he was appointed as Deputy Mayor of Budapest. From 25 October he was a member of the Hungarian National Council which was created by the radical and anti-war parties with leading of Mihály Károlyi. Károlyi appointed Harrer as ambassador to Austria. Then he served as Minister of Foreign Affairs in Dénes Berinkey's cabinet. During the establishment of the Hungarian Soviet Republic he had to leave his position.

He was in retirement from August 1919 to 1925. After that he was a politician in the General Assembly of Budapest. From 1934 he worked as a representative in the House of Magnates of Hungary. Later, from 1949 until his death, he was the eldest member of the National Assembly (ranking member). Harrer died in his birthplace, Budapest.

References
 Magyar Életrajzi Lexikon

1874 births
1969 deaths
Politicians from Budapest
Foreign ministers of Hungary